Bazui (also Romanized as Bāzū’ī; also known as Bārū’ī and Bāzūhā) is a village in Ahram Rural District of the Central District of Tangestan County, Bushehr province, Iran. At the 2006 census, its population was 1,140 in 265 households. The following census in 2011 counted 1,212 people in 350 households. The latest census in 2016 showed a population of 1,344 people in 395 households; it was the largest village in its rural district.

References 

Populated places in Tangestan County